Mary Lawson (born 1946) is a Canadian novelist.

Biography
Born in southwestern Ontario, she spent her childhood in Blackwell, Ontario, and is a distant relative of L. M. Montgomery, author of Anne of Green Gables. Her father worked as a research chemist. With a psychology degree in hand from McGill University, Lawson took a trip to Britain and ended up accepting a job as an industrial psychologist. She married a British psychologist, Richard Mobbs. Lawson spent her summers in the north, and the landscape inspired her to use Northern Ontario as her settings for both her novels. Lawson later admitted that Muskoka, where she spent her summers, "isn't and never was the North", but the area now called Cottage Country "felt like it" to people from the south. She has two grown-up sons and lives in Kingston-Upon-Thames.

In a book review, T. F. Rigelhof of The Globe and Mail stated: "Within days you'll see people reading Crow Lake in odd places as they take quick breaks from the business of their lives. You'll also hear people say 'I stayed up all night reading this book by Mary Lawson. Mary Lawson, Mary Lawson. Remember the name."

Robert Fulford of the National Post wrote an article about Lawson describing her process towards becoming a novelist. After settling down, she wrote short fiction for women's magazines and then graduated to her first novel. Lawson was in her 50s when she wrote it, and spent years perfecting it. She decided she disliked her first novel and then spent five more years writing until Crow Lake was complete. It took her 3 more years to find a publisher.

On the National Posts Paperback Fiction Best-Sellers list in 2007, Lawson's second novel, The Other Side of the Bridge, took the number-one spot.

An article featuring Mary Lawson was published in the McGill News magazine by Neale Mcdevitt and Daniel Mccabe. After her first novel, the article describes Mary Lawson as surprised by her success:  "I really didn't know what I had done right. I didn't know if I could do it again." Her first novel, Crow Lake, was published in 22 countries and landed her a guest appearance on the Today Show, and several positive reviews in the New York Times, the Guardian, and many other publications. Her second novel, The Other Side of the Bridge, also did well. She received good reviews from The Independent, and the Toronto Star. This second novel held promise of being on the Maclean magazine's list of Canadian bestsellers.

A French-language edition of Crow Lake was translated by Cécile Arnaud, was published as Le choix des Morrison by  Belfond in 2003.

A Town Called Solace was longlisted for the 2021 Booker Prize.

Bibliography
 Crow Lake (2002) 
 in German: Sabine Lohmann, Andreas Gressmann transl.: Rückkehr nach Crow Lake. Heyne, Munich 2002
 The Other Side of the Bridge (2006) 
 in German: Sabine Lohmann, transl.: Auf der anderen Seite des Flusses. Heyne, 2006
 Road Ends (2013) 
 A Town Called Solace (2021)

Awards and recognition
 2002: winner, Books in Canada First Novel Award, Crow Lake
 2003: winner, McKitterick Prize, Crow Lake
 2006: longlisted, Man Booker Prize for Fiction, The Other Side of the Bridge
 2005: winner, Evergreen Award, Crow Lake
 2006: shortlisted, Rogers Writers' Trust Fiction Prize, The Other Side of the Bridge
 2021: longlisted, Booker Prize for Fiction,  A Town Called Solace

References

1946 births
Living people
Canadian expatriates in England
Canadian women novelists
McGill University Faculty of Science alumni
People from Sarnia
Writers from Ontario
21st-century Canadian novelists
21st-century Canadian women writers
Canadian expatriate writers
Amazon.ca First Novel Award winners